Sirwah (OSA: Ṣrwḥ,  Ṣirwāḥ Ḫawlān) was, after Ma'rib, the most important economical and political center of the Kingdom of Saba at the beginning of the 1st century BC, on the Arabian Peninsula. Ṣirwāḥ was surrounded by a fortified wall. The city layout inside the oasis included a number of large buildings.

The ruins of Ṣirwāḥ are located 40 km west of  Ma'rib. The town was well protected by its position in the mountains, but at the same time put limits on its development. As a result, Ṣirwāḥ quickly lost its position as a capital, which was taken over by Ma’rib, which was in an important economical center since it was located on the incense route. The town nevertheless remained an important centre for the Sabaeans, as shown by the large number of temple buildings. It was also the site chosen by King Yada'il Dharih I to build an important temple to Almaqah about the year 700 BC.

Archaeology

Archaeologists from the German Archaeological Institute have since 2005 discovered and salvaged an inscription from the Sabaean Kingdom that is over seven meters long. This seven tonne heavy block of stone was a standing feature of the sanctuary of Almaqah and had fallen from its plinth during an earthquake. The epigraphist Norbert Nebes from the University of Jena described the inscription as the most important one so far from the period of the first century BC. The inscription gives an account of the battles of a Sabaean, carried out against his immediate neighbors in the south-east and north of Yemen.

Some restorative work was undertaken on these sites before the breakout of the Yemeni Civil War. During these works a further temple was discovered dating back to the 7th century BC. This sanctuary has a monumental entrance, decorated with pillars. It contains a number of rooms, built out of wood and stone, the layout is unique for Yemen in this period. One of the longest inscriptions which composed of 20 lines is describing the conquerors and campaigns by king Karib'il Watar.

Since the breakout of civil war in Yemen in 2015, Ṣirwāḥ has been a frontline between the Houthi rebels and forces allied with President Abdrabbuh Mansur Hadi, making excavations almost impossible. Prior to this, a number of German excavations took place in Ṣirwāḥ, which it was hoped would further knowledge about the earliest days of the Sabaean Kingdom.

References

External links
 Monumentale Inschrift im Reich der Königin von Saba gefunden|Monumental Inscription found in the Kingdom of Saba (PDF; 175 kB)
 Stadtmauern von Sirwah| the City walls of Sirwah
 Tempel im Jemen. Fundsache, Nr. 309. nt-v.de 19. März 2008
 Mitteilung des Deutschen Archäologischen Instituts

Archaeological sites in Yemen
Architecture of ancient Yemen
World Heritage Sites in Yemen
Landmarks of the Ancient Kingdom of Saba (Marib)